Tha Eastsidaz is the eponymous debut studio album by American Gangsta rap group Tha Eastsidaz. It was released on February 1, 2000, on Dogghouse Records and TVT Records. The album was recorded at Dogghouse Studio, Music Grinder & Skip Saylor Recording, Hollywood, California.

Most of the songs were performed live on Hustler's rap-porn compilation Snoop Dogg's Doggystyle XXX DVD. The album was executive produced by Snoop Dogg.

Critical reception

The album overall received generally positive reviews from music critics.

Commercial performance 
Tha Eastsidaz debuted at number 8 on the US Billboard 200, selling 100,000 copies in its first week. It was certificated Platinum on October 11, 2000.

Music Videos
Despite only 2 songs being released as singles, Tha Eastsidaz did a total of 6 videos altogether off the album: "Dogghouse" f/Rappin' 4-Tay & Twinz; "G'd Up" f/Butch Cassidy (directed by Diane Martel); "Got Beef" f/Jayo Felony & Sylk-E. Fine (directed by Chris Robinson (director)); "Now We Lay 'Em Down" f/Kokane; "Tha Eastsidaz" & "The Gangsta In Deee"

Track listing

Charts

Weekly charts

Year-end charts

Certifications

External links 
 Music.com
 Top40 charts

References 

2000 debut albums
Snoop Dogg albums
Tray Deee albums
Albums produced by Battlecat (producer)
Albums produced by JellyRoll
Albums produced by L.T. Hutton
Albums produced by Soopafly
Albums produced by Warren G
Albums produced by Keith Clizark
Tha Eastsidaz albums
Collaborative albums